Alexander Hay (April 8, 1806 – November 5, 1882) was Mayor of Pittsburgh, USA, from 1842 to 1845.

Biography
Hay was born in the neighborhood known as Scotch Hill. By age eleven, he worked in a glass house and learned the trade of cabinetry.

The Roman Catholic Diocese of Pittsburgh was created during Mayor Hay's term. Also, navigation on the Monongahela River was opened as far south as Brownsville during his administration.

Hay's life of public service continued after his term as mayor. He commanded the Jackson Blues during the Mexican War. During the Civil War, he was captain of Company E. Pennsylvania Regiment. He was at the Battle of Yorktown.

He and his son were the proprietors of a fine furniture business. Hay died in 1882 and is buried in the Allegheny Cemetery.

See also

List of Mayors of Pittsburgh

References
South Pittsburgh Development Corporation
Political Graveyard

1806 births
1882 deaths
Mayors of Pittsburgh
Union Army soldiers
American military personnel of the Mexican–American War
Burials at Allegheny Cemetery
19th-century American politicians